Qaleh-ye Mirzai (also Romanized as Qal‘eh-ye Mīrzā’ī and Qal‘eh Mīrzā’ī; also known as Ghal‘ehé Mirzai) is a village in Kavar Rural District, in the Central District of Kavar County, Fars Province, Iran. At the 2006 census, its population was 564, in 124 families.

References 

Populated places in Kavar County